Charlie Holt (July 17, 1922 – March 17, 2000) was an American ice hockey coach. He was the head coach of  the University of New Hampshire from 1968 thru 1986. He is one of three 3-time recipients of the college ice hockey National Coach-of-the-Year Award (the others being Len Ceglarski and Jack Parker).

Career
Holt began coaching men's ice hockey immediately after graduating from Dartmouth in 1946. He spent one year each at Cranbrook Schools and Melrose High School before joining the US National Team for the 1949 World Ice Hockey Championships helping the Americans to a bronze medal finish, their first medal since the start of World War II. A few years later Charlie found himself behind the bench for Northwood School where he would remain as head coach from 1955-1962 before he got his first collegiate offer.

Holt's college head coaching career began just after he turned 40 in 1962–63 when he took over at Colby College. At the time the Mules were competing in the 28-team ECAC Hockey mega-conference as a Division I program but, two years later when the conference was split, Colby was placed in the Division III league and had competed as such ever since. While Holt wasn't able to lead Colby into the postseason while they were a D-I team, once they dropped down into the lower division he got them to three ECAC playoff appearances in four seasons. After Rube Bjorkman departed New Hampshire to take over the top job at North Dakota the Wildcats announced Holt as their head coach starting with the 1968–69 season.

Holt started his career in Durham off with a bang, earning the Wildcats a 22-win season as well as their first conference postseason appearance. Despite falling in the first round to Harvard Holt was awarded the Spencer Penrose Award by the American Hockey Coaches Association. Holt continued to have great success with New Hampshire over the next several years, recording winning seasons in each of the following ten campaigns, making the ECAC postseason tournament nine times in that span and winning both the regular season and conference tournament title once. Even after recording his first losing record with New Hampshire in 1979–80 season Holt brought the Wildcats back to prominence two years later with three consecutive 20-win seasons and two straight NCAA tournament berths. The returns began to diminish, however, once New Hampshire left the ECAC to become a founding member of Hockey East. In the first year Holt recorded only his second losing season with the Wildcats followed by a 5-win campaign, New Hampshire's worst record in over three decades. Holt stepped down after the 1985–86 season, allowing long-time assistant Bob Kullen to take over.

After taking a few years off Holt returned to his old stomping grounds of high school hockey when he was named as the head coach for Berwick Academy. He stayed in that position for seven years before retiring for good in 1996. In 1997 Holt was inducted into the US Hockey Hall of Fame. On March 17, 2000 Charlie Holt died as a result of cancer, He was survived by his wife Nancy and their two children: Brad and Brenda. Holt has received several posthumous honors, including being inducted into both the New Hampshire (2002) and Massachusetts (2006) Hockey Halls of Fame and being named the 2010 Hobey Baker Legend of College Hockey.

Head coaching record

College

See also
List of college men's ice hockey coaches with 400 wins

References

External links
 

1922 births
2000 deaths
American ice hockey coaches
Colby Mules men's ice hockey coaches
High school ice hockey coaches in the United States
New Hampshire Wildcats men's ice hockey coaches
People from Melrose, Massachusetts
Ice hockey coaches from Massachusetts
Sportspeople from Middlesex County, Massachusetts